Waiting for Love may refer to:

 "Waiting for Love" (Alias song), 1991
 "Waiting for Love" (Avicii song), 2015
 Waiting for Love (film), a 1981 Soviet romantic comedy directed by Pyotr Todorovsky
 Waiting for Love, a 2009 album by JJ Lin
 Waiting for Love, a 1999 album by Shujaat Khan
 "Waiting for Love", a 1986 song by Great White from Shot in the Dark
 "Waiting for Love", a 1986 single by Pete Shelley
 "Waiting for Love", a 1992 song by David Benoit from Letter to Evan
 "Waiting for Love", a 1997 song by Nanci Griffith from Blue Roses from the Moons
 "Waiting for Love", a 2003 song by P!nk from the album Try This
 "Waiting for Love", a 2012 song by Medina from Forever
 "Waiting for Your Love", a 1983 song by Toto

See also
 Wait for Love (disambiguation)